Katja Koren Miklavec (born 6 August 1975) is a former Slovenian alpine skier.

Born in Maribor, she won a bronze medal in the 1994 Winter Olympics in Lillehammer. She took her sole World Cup win at the age of 18 in a Super-G in Flachau in December 1993, taking victory from a bib number of 66, a few days after Markus Foser had won at Val Gardena with the same start number. Koren was the first woman to take an Alpine Ski World Cup win for Slovenia, a couple of days after Jure Košir became the first man to win a World Cup race for Slovenia as an independent nation in Madonna di Campiglio.

She retired from skiing in 1998, due to a spinal injury.

Since 2008, she has been active in politics, and has run twice on the electoral lists of the Slovenian Democratic Party.

World Cup results

Season standings

Race podiums
 1 win (1 SG)
 5 podiums (4 SL, 1 SG)

Olympic Games results

World Championships results

References 

1975 births
Living people
Slovenian female alpine skiers
Alpine skiers at the 1994 Winter Olympics
Olympic alpine skiers of Slovenia
Olympic bronze medalists for Slovenia
Sportspeople from Maribor
Slovenian Democratic Party politicians
Olympic medalists in alpine skiing
Medalists at the 1994 Winter Olympics
Slovenian sportsperson-politicians
21st-century Slovenian women politicians
21st-century Slovenian politicians